So B. It is a children's novel by Sarah Weeks, released In 2007. It received awards in Illinois (the Rebecca Caudill Young Reader's Book Award) and Kansas (the William Allen White Children's Book Award). The book recounts the story of a young girl's relationship with her disabled mother, her quest to learn more about her family, and her desire to discover the truth.

Settings
Reno, Nevada - Heidi's home town
Liberty, New York
Fernley, Nevada
Salt Lake City, Utah
Lovelock, Nevada
Rock Springs, Wyoming
Cheyenne, Wyoming
Des Moines, Iowa
New York City, New York
Monticello, New York

Book summary
Heidi is a twelve-year-old girl with a mentally disabled mother, but who is otherwise extremely lucky. She and her mother are taken care of by their next-door neighbour, Bernadette after the two appeared at her door when Heidi was a newborn. Heidi has no information about her family, other than what her mother says through her 23-word vocabulary, including the word soof. Heidi sets out to discover her family's history and origins and travels on her own from Reno, Nevada to Liberty, New York to visit the group home in the photographs she discovered in her house.

Characters
Heidi DeMuth (originally known as Heidi It): The main character in the story. A twelve-year-old girl, she is kind, courageous, extremely lucky and determined.

Sophia Lynne DeMuth (called Mama by Heidi; Soof by Elliot; Precious Bouquet or just Precious by Bernadette; and So Be It by herself): Heidi's mentally disabled mother. She is kind and loving, even though she has a very limited vocabulary and little ability to learn. She likes Jujyfruit candies but dislikes buses (see Diane DeMuth).

Bernadette "Bernie" (called Dette by Sophia): Heidi's next-door neighbour who acts as mother or guardian to Heidi. She has agoraphobia.

 Alexander "Zander": An older boy who lives in Heidi's apartment building. Though gruff, Heidi enjoys his company because he tells outlandish stories she likes to analyze their truthfulness.

Elliot Hill: Heidi's father and Sophia's best friend. He is also mentally disabled. Calls Sophia "soof" because he cannot pronounce "Sophia".

Thurman Hill: Heidi's grandfather. He works at Hilltop Home, a place for the mentally disabled, where Heidi's mother lived for a year.

Ruby Franklin: A Hilltop Home employee who helps Heidi with her quest and takes care of her for part of her journey. Her husband is Roy Franklin (see below).

Roy Franklin: Ruby's husband, a local sheriff, helps Heidi find the truth about herself, as well as the meaning behind the word "soof".

Diane DeMuth: Heidi's grandmother. She, unfortunately, died when Heidi was born, in a bus accident, the reason Sophia is afraid of buses.

Alice Wilinsky: The first person Heidi rides with on her way to Liberty. In response to Alice's prolonged discussion of her own extended family, Heidi invents a fantasy family life that includes answers to questions she is seeking to solve, but Alice knows that Heidi is lying and becomes disinterested in a continuing conversation.

Georgia Sweet: An 18-year-old bound for college who joins Heidi for the next part of her bus trip. Unlike Alice Wilinsky, Georgia is more interested in Heidi than herself, and Heidi finds herself sharing her true story in detail and without embellishment.

Film adaptation

The book was adapted into a film released in 2016,  directed by Stephen Gyllenhaal, starring Talitha Bateman, Jessie Collins, Alfre Woodard, John Heard, Jacinda Barrett, Dash Mihok, and Cloris Leachman.

References

American children's novels
2004 American novels
Novels set in Nevada
Novels by Sarah Weeks
HarperCollins books
2004 children's books